Sugar Run is a tributary of Bowman Creek in Luzerne County and Wyoming County, in Pennsylvania, in the United States. The surficial geology in its vicinity consists of alluvium, alluvial fan, Wisconsinan Till, and bedrock. The stream's watershed is designated as a High-Quality Coldwater Fishery and a Migratory Fishery.

Course
Sugar Run begins in a valley in Lake Township, Luzerne County. It flows northwest for more than a mile, entering Noxen Township, Wyoming County. The stream then turns west-northwest for a short distance before turning northwest and leaving its valley. A few tenths of a mile further downstream, it gradually turns northeast and reaches its confluence with Bowman Creek.

Geography and geology

The surficial geology in the vicinity of the mouth of Sugar Run consists of alluvium and alluvial fan. Slightly further upstream, there is a till known as Wisconsinan Till, which is underlain with glacial lake clays in some reaches. In the Sweet Valley quadrangle, the stream passes through land with a surficial geology consisting of Wisconsinan Till, but bedrock consisting of sandstone and shale is not far away.

Watershed and hydrology
The mouth of the stream is in the United States Geological Survey quadrangle of Dutch Mountain. However, its source is in the quadrangle of Harveys Lake. The stream also passes through the quadrangle of Sweet Valley. The streams mouth is located near Mountain Springs.

Sugar Run attains the requirements for use by aquatic life.

History
Sugar Run was entered into the Geographic Names Information System on August 2, 1979. Its identifier in the Geographic Names Information System is 1199768.

Biology
The drainage basin of Sugar Run is designated as a High-Quality Coldwater Fishery and a Migratory Fishery. Wild trout naturally reproduce in the stream from its headwaters downstream to its mouth.

See also
Broad Hollow Run, next tributary of Bowman Creek going downstream
Cider Run (Bowman Creek), next tributary of Bowman Creek going upstream
List of rivers of Pennsylvania
List of tributaries of Bowman Creek

References

Rivers of Luzerne County, Pennsylvania
Rivers of Wyoming County, Pennsylvania
Tributaries of Bowman Creek
Rivers of Pennsylvania